The health of Adolf Hitler, dictator of Germany from 1933 to 1945, has long been a subject of popular controversy. Both his physical and mental health have come under scrutiny.

During his younger days, Hitler's health was generally good, despite his lack of exercise and a poor diet, which he later replaced with a mostly vegetarian one. Even then, though, Hitler had a very strong sweet tooth, and would often eat multiple cream cakes at a sitting. Later, however, as the tension and pressure of being the Führer of Germany began to take its toll, Hitler's health took a downturn from which he never really recovered. Exacerbated by the many drugs and potions he was given by his unconventional doctor, Theodor Morell, and undermined by Hitler's own hypochondria, his premonition of a short lifespan, and his fear of cancer (which killed his mother), the dictator's health declined almost continuously until his death by suicide in 1945.

By the time of his last public appearance just days before his death, in the garden of the New Reich Chancellery building, where he reviewed and congratulated teenaged Volkssturm ("people's storm") and Hitler Youth soldiers for their efforts in the Battle of Berlin against the Soviet Red Army, Hitler was bent over, shuffled when he walked, and could not stop his left arm, which he held behind him, from trembling.  His eyes were glassy, his skin was greasy, and his speech could sometimes barely be heard. He looked to be much older than his actual age, which was 56, and hardly resembled the charismatic orator who had led the Nazi Party to power.

Trauma

First World War

1944 assassination attempt

As a result of the 20 July 1944 assassination attempt on Hitler – in which he survived a bomb explosion at his Wolf's Lair headquarters – both of his eardrums were punctured, and he had numerous superficial wounds, including blisters, burns and 200 wood splinters on his hands and legs, cuts on his forehead, abrasions and swelling on his left arm, and a right arm that was swollen, painful and difficult to raise, causing him to use his left hand to greet Benito Mussolini, who arrived that day for a previously scheduled summit meeting.  The punctured eardrums were the most serious of these injuries.  Weeks later, blood was still seeping through Hitler's bandages, and he suffered sharp pain in the right ear, as well as hearing loss.  The eardrums took several weeks to heal, during which Hitler suffered from dizziness and a loss of balance which made him hew to the right when walking.  In addition, his blood pressure was high.  One unusual result was that the trembling in Hitler's hands and left leg, which had increasingly afflicted him for sometime, abated for a time after the explosion, which Morell attributed to nervous shock; they returned in mid-September.

Syphilis
Adolf Hitler's tremor and irregular heartbeat during the last years of his life could have been symptoms of tertiary (late stage) syphilis, which would mean he had a syphilis infection for many years. However, syphilis had become curable in 1910 with Dr. Paul Ehrlich's introduction of the drug Salvarsan.

In The Man with the Miraculous Hands, his biography of Dr. Felix Kersten, journalist Joseph Kessel wrote that in the winter of 1942, Kersten heard of Hitler's medical condition. Consulted by his patient, Himmler, as to whether he could "assist a man who suffers from severe headaches, dizziness and insomnia", Kersten was shown a top-secret 26-page report. It detailed how Hitler had contracted syphilis in his youth and was treated for it at a hospital in Pasewalk. However, in 1937, symptoms re-appeared, showing that the disease was still active, and by the start of 1942, signs were evident that progressive syphilitic paralysis (Tabes dorsalis) was occurring. Himmler advised Kersten that Morell (who in the 1930s claimed to be a specialist venereologist) was in charge of Hitler's treatment, and that it was a state secret. The book also relates how Kersten learned from Himmler's secretary, Rudolf Brandt, that at that time, probably the only other people privy to the report's information were Nazi Party chairman Martin Bormann and Hermann Göring, the head of the Luftwaffe.

Monorchism

It has been alleged that Hitler had monorchism, the medical condition of having only one testicle. In 2008, a British newspaper reported that in 1916, a German doctor named Johan Jambor had encountered an injured Hitler during the Battle of the Somme. Jambor allegedly asserted that Hitler—who is known to have suffered a groin injury in the battle—had in fact lost a testicle. Jambor had supposedly described the dictator's condition to a priest, who later wrote down what he had been told.

Soviet doctor Lev Bezymensky, allegedly involved in the Soviet autopsy, stated in a 1967 book that Hitler's left testicle was missing. Bezymensky later admitted that the claim was falsified.

Hitler was routinely examined by many doctors throughout his childhood, military service and later political career, and no clinical mention of any such condition has ever been discovered. Eduard Bloch, Hitler’s childhood doctor, told U.S. interrogators in 1943 that Hitler's genitals were in fact "completely normal".

Huntington's disease 

It has been speculated that Hitler had Huntington's disease. When many of the physical symptoms shown in newsreels during his later life – his hand tremor and shuffling gait –  are coupled with his alleged mental and psychological deterioration, they may also point toward Huntington's.  This is only conjecture, since a definitive diagnosis would require DNA testing.  Although Huntington's Disease was known and considered a hereditary disease during the time period, even appearing in state papers on the sterilization list, it is not known if Hitler knew of this condition.

Parkinson's disease 
It has also been speculated Hitler had Parkinson's disease. Newsreels of Hitler show he had tremors in his left hand and a shuffling walk (also a symptom of tertiary syphilis, see above) which began before the war and continued to worsen until the end of his life. Morell treated Hitler with a drug agent that was commonly used in 1945, although Morell is viewed as an incompetent doctor by most historians and any diagnoses he may have made are subject to doubt.

Dr. Werner Haase, Hitler's personal physician, who was in attendance every day from 21 April until Hitler's suicide on 30 April, was convinced that Hitler had Parkinson's.  In addition, Dr. Ernst-Günther Schenck, who worked at an emergency casualty station in the Reich Chancellery during April 1945, also claimed Hitler might have Parkinson's disease. However, Schenck only saw Hitler briefly on two occasions and, by his own admission, was extremely exhausted and dazed during these meetings; at the time, he had been in surgery for numerous days without much sleep.

Other complaints
From the 1930s Hitler suffered from stomach pains. In 1936 a non-cancerous polyp was removed from his throat. Hitler also developed eczema on his legs. Some doctors dismiss Hitler's ailments as hypochondria, pointing out the apparently drastic decline of Hitler's health as Germany began losing World War II.

Mental health

As debated as Hitler's physical medical issues may be, his mental health is a minefield of theories and speculation. This topic is controversial, as many believe that if a psychological cause can be found for Hitler's behavior, there would be more reasoning behind his actions.

In 1993, the interdisciplinary team Desmond Henry, Dick Geary and Peter Tyrer published an essay in which they expressed their common view that Hitler had antisocial personality disorder as defined in ICD-10. Tyrer, a psychiatrist, was convinced that Hitler furthermore showed signs of paranoia and of histrionic personality disorder. Robert G. L. Waite, who wrote an extensive psychohistory of Hitler, concluded that he suffered from borderline personality disorder, which manifested its symptoms in numerous ways and would imply Hitler was in full control of himself and his actions. Others have proposed Hitler may have been schizophrenic, based on claims that he was hallucinating and delusional during his last year of life. Many people believe that Hitler had a mental disorder and was not schizophrenic nor bipolar, but rather met the criteria for both disorders, and was therefore most likely a schizoaffective. If true, this might be explained by a series of brief reactive psychoses in a narcissistic personality which could not withstand being confronted with reality (in this case, that he was not the "superman" or "savior of Germany" he envisioned himself to be, as his plans and apparent early achievements collapsed about him). In addition, his regular methamphetamine use and possible sleep deprivation in the last period of his life must be factored into any speculation as to the cause of his possible psychotic symptoms, as these two activities are known to trigger psychotic reactions in some individuals. Hitler never visited a psychiatrist, and under current methodology, any such diagnosis is speculation.

Drug use

Prescribed 90 medications during the war years by Theodor Morell, Hitler took many pills each day for chronic stomach problems and other ailments. He regularly consumed methamphetamine, barbiturates, opiates, and cocaine, as well as potassium bromide and atropa belladonna (the latter in the form of Doktor Koster's Antigaspills).

Criticism of using Hitler's health to explain Nazism

In a 1980 article, the German historian Hans-Ulrich Wehler was highly dismissive of all theories that sought to attribute the rise and policies of Nazi Germany to some defect, medical or otherwise, of Hitler's. In Wehler's opinion, besides the problem that such theories about Hitler's medical condition were extremely difficult to prove, the problem was that they had the effect of personalizing the phenomena of Nazi Germany by more or less attributing everything that happened in the Third Reich to one flawed individual. Wehler wrote:

Echoing Wehler's views, the British historian Ian Kershaw argued that it was better to take a broader view of German history by seeking to examine what social forces led to the Third Reich and its policies, as opposed to the "personalized" explanations for the Holocaust and World War II.

In his book Explaining Hitler: The Search for the Origins of His Evil (1998), the American journalist Ron Rosenbaum sarcastically remarked that theories concerning Hitler's mental state and sexual activity shed more light on the theorists and their culture than on Hitler.

Inbreeding as a possible factor
It has been theorized that Hitler's physical and mental health problems were the result of Hitler having been significantly inbred, possibly having monorchism. With his father Alois Hitler possibly being his mother's second cousin. People who are inbred have a higher chance of having developmental disorders and harmful mutations.

References
Notes

Bibliography
 
 
 
 
 
 
 
 
 
 
 
 

Further reading

External links
 Did Hitler have only one testicle? from The Straight Dope
 OSS document alleging sexual deviancy
 History Channel's Episode - High Hitler

Health
Hitler, Adolf
Huntington's disease